Bacacay, officially the Municipality of Bacacay, is a 2nd class municipality in the province of Albay, Philippines. According to the 2020 census, it has a population of 72,485 people. Bacacay is primarily an agricultural town and abundant in seafood.

Geography
Bacacay is bordered by Malilipot town in the northwest and Santo Domingo in the southwest. Other barangays are located in Cagraray island and is shared with neighboring Malilipot town.

According to the Philippine Statistics Authority, the municipality has a land area of  constituting  of the  total area of Albay.

Barangays
Bacacay is politically subdivided into 56 barangays.

Climate

Demographics

In the 2020 census, Bacacay had a population of 72,485.

Economy

Government

List of Mayors
Armando B. Romano 
Tobias Betito 
Gloria Berango 
Eligio Berango 
Berting Lawenko

Education
Bacacay has 41 elementary schools and 7 secondary schools directly supervised by Department of Education-Division of Albay.

Primary schools

Bacacay East Central School
Banao Elementary School
Bariw Elementary School
Basud Elementary School
Bayandong Elementary School
Bogna Elementary School
Buang Elementary School
Busdac Elementary School
Cabasan Elementary School
Cagbulacao Elementary School
Cagraray Elementary School
Cajugotan Elementary School
Cawayan Elementary School
Damacan Elementary School
Gubat Elementary School
Hindi Elementary School
Igang Elementary School
Langaton Elementary School
Lower Bonga Elementary School
Manaet Elementary School
Mapulang Daga Elementary School
Mataas Elementary School
Misibis Elementary School
Nahapunan Elementary School
Namanday Elementary School
Namantao Elementary School
Napao Elementary School
Panarayon Elementary School
Pigcobuhan Elementary School
Pili Elementary School
San Pablo Elementary School
San Pedro Elementary School
Sogod Elementary School
Sula Elementary School
Tambilagao Elementary School
Tambongon Elementary School
Tanagan Elementary School
Upper Bonga Elementary School
Uson Elementary School
Vinisitahan East Elementary School
Vinisitahan South Elementary School

Secondary schools

Bonga National High School
Cabasan National High School
Cawayan National High School
Pili National High School
San Pablo High School
Sogod National High School
Vinisitahan National High School

Colleges
Bacacay Community College
Zamora Memorial College

Notable personalities

Crispin Beltran - Filipino labor leader. Former member of 13th Congress of the Philippines with the Anakpawis ("Toiling Masses") party-list and former chair of Kilusang Mayo Uno (KMU), a militant and progressive labor movement.
Ana T. Calixto - Bikol-language short story writer
Benedict Adamos - Basketball player of the University of Perpetual Help Deltas
Joshua Villar - Basketball player of the Bicol Volcanoes
 Leo Styles - International Fashion Stylist

Gallery

References

External links

 

 [ Philippine Standard Geographic Code]
LGU Profile of Bacacay

Municipalities of Albay